The Bugaboo Fire was a wildfire that helped feed one of the largest fires in Georgia history. It raged from April to June 2007 and ultimately merged with other fires becoming the largest fire in the history of both Georgia and Florida.  The Bugaboo, which was not actually named until it had blazed for nearly a month, started in the Okefenokee Swamp, most of which is located in Georgia. It merged with the Sweat Farm Road Fire creating the largest south GA fire in documented history. It was the culmination of several converging fires.

Georgia
On April 16, a downed power line started the Sweat Farm Road fire southwest of Waycross.  When it entered the Okefenokee National Wildlife Refuge on April 21, it was renamed Big Turnaround. Close by, the Bugaboo fire was ignited by lightning on May 5. By May 20, the fires converged and became the Georgia Bay Complex - one of the largest fires in the South and the nation.

This fire started when a tree fell on a power line on April 16, during high winds (caused by the April 2007 nor'easter and a strong high-pressure system), and low humidity along with drought conditions. By April 30, it had burned about 80,000 acres (320 km²)—about 20% of which was in the refuge—and had also destroyed 22 homes, and forced the evacuations of over 1,000 people. The governor of Georgia made a disaster declaration, making Ware and Brantley counties eligible for government aid.

Smoke closed several roads in the area, including U.S. 1.

By May 9, the main fire had consumed over 116,000 acres (469 km²), mainly south of Waycross, east of Fargo and west of Folkston in the Okefenokee National Wildlife Refuge. Many cities were threatened, but were never under siege. Subtropical Storm Andrea—which some had hoped might bring relief—apparently exacerbated the situation, as it drove strong winds into the fire but brought very little rain.  These winds may have been the reason that the fire then blew across the border into northeast Florida.

Florida
On May 8, the Bugaboo fire was started by lightning at Bugaboo Island in the Okefenokee National Wildlife Refuge, and soon crept over the state line into Florida (and hence became the retronymed Bugaboo Scrub fire).  It expanded extraordinarily quickly, combining with other fires that were already blazing in Georgia, and by May 16 had grown to 120,000 acres (490 km²). By May 22 it had burned 475,000 acres (1,920 km²) in Georgia and Florida. By the end of May  had burned.  The Florida Folk Festival, the nation's oldest continuous festival, was cancelled for the first time because of the fire. (It was later re-scheduled for November.)

The major fire which entered from Georgia caused closures of Interstate 75 from the state line (and at times as far north as Valdosta) to Interstate 10. I-10 also had sections closed as well, sometimes as long as 40 mile (65 km).

Hundreds were evacuated from homes in Columbia County, Florida late on May 10, and a state of emergency was declared.

The reach of the smoke 
During the time these fires were burning, thick, sooty smoke blanketed the city of Jacksonville, Florida and the entire area of northeast Florida and southeast Georgia for many days. At times, the smoke reduced visibility to under a quarter of a mile and caused many health concerns.

On May 22, 2007, from southern Georgia to Metro Atlanta, residents awoke to a blanket of smoke across the horizon. A strong smoke smell was very clear, and there were reports of people with irritated eyes, noses, and lungs. Some people with asthma were rushed to hospitals as a result of the smoke.

Smoke at times reduced visibility as far south as central Florida, and was even blown all the way down to Fort Lauderdale in south Florida, putting the local air quality index in the unhealthy range. Smoke later drifted across southern Alabama and even to Meridian, Mississippi.

By June 22, the wildfires in Georgia were largely contained. The containment came after beneficial, heavy rain blanketed the region from Tropical Storm Barry in June 2007.

See also
Honey Prairie Fire

References

External links
FCN story
Latest NWS fire weather advisory for Ware county
    
NASA satellite picture and article
Orlando Sentinel article
Florida Department of Forestry daily report
St. Petersburg Times article, May 15
WSAV TV article
Lake Okeechobee Florida Brushfire Video June 16- Stormvideographer
Buckhead Ridge Florida Wildfire Video May 29- Stormvideographer

2007 wildfires in the United States
Wildfires in Georgia (U.S. state)
Wildfires in Florida
Natural disasters in Georgia (U.S. state)
Natural disasters in Florida
Ware County, Georgia
Brantley County, Georgia
Clinch County, Georgia
Gilmer County, Georgia
Murray County, Georgia
Columbia County, Florida
2007 in Florida
2007 in Georgia (U.S. state)